Shinhan Financial Group Co., Ltd. is a financial holding company headquartered in Seoul, South Korea. Its subsidiaries provide a full range of financial services, including banking, securities, life insurance, and investment banking. It is one of Korea's Big Five financial groups, along with KB Financial Group, NH Financial Group, Hana Financial Group and Woori Financial Group.

Subsidiaries
Shinhan Financial Group owns a total of 17 direct subsidiaries under Korean Law.

See also
Shinhan Donghae Open

References

External links
 

Companies based in Seoul
South Korean brands
Companies listed on the Korea Exchange
Companies listed on the New York Stock Exchange
South Korean companies established in 2001